Evie Christie is a Canadian poet and author.  Her works includes the poetry collection Gutted (2005) and her debut novel, The Bourgeois Empire (2010) both published by ECW Press.
She adapted two plays for Graham McLaren and Necessary Angel Theatre Company. Andromache was commissioned by and premiered at Lumimato and 360 (La Ronde) was commissioned by and premiered at the National Theatre School of Canada.
She ran the popular blog, Desk Space.

References

Canadian women poets
Canadian women novelists
Living people
21st-century Canadian novelists
21st-century Canadian poets
21st-century Canadian women writers
Year of birth missing (living people)